David H. Zimmerman (born April 13, 1956) is an American politician and current member of the Pennsylvania House of Representatives, representing the 99th District.

Biography
Zimmerman was born on April 13, 1956 in Narvon, Pennsylvania, and grew up on a dairy farm.

Zimmerman served in several positions in his native Lancaster County, Pennsylvania, including as chairman of the board of supervisors of East Earl Township.

Pennsylvania House of Representatives
Zimmerman was first elected the represent the 99th District in the Pennsylvania House of Representatives in 2014. He was re-elected in 2016, 2018, 2020, and 2022.

In 2020, Zimmerman was among 26 Pennsylvania House Republicans who called for the reversal of Joe Biden's certification as the winner of Pennsylvania's electoral votes in the 2020 United States presidential election, citing false claims of election irregularities.

In a speech on September 24, 2022 in support of Doug Mastriano, Zimmerman told the crowd he had received a subpoena from the FBI regarding the January 6 United States Capitol attack, claiming that "the FBI looked for me all day long, but what I did that they didn't know is, I turned my phone tracker off."

Personal life
Zimmerman resides in East Earl Township, Lancaster County, Pennsylvania with his wife, Ruth Ann. They have three children and seven grandchildren.

Electoral history

References

External links
Official Web Site
PA House profile

Living people
People from Lancaster County, Pennsylvania
Republican Party members of the Pennsylvania House of Representatives
21st-century American politicians
1956 births